WFXL, virtual channel 31 (VHF digital channel 12), is a Fox-affiliated television station licensed to Albany, Georgia, United States, and serving Southwestern Georgia. The station is owned by the Hunt Valley, Maryland–based Sinclair Broadcast Group. WFXL's studios are located on Stuart Avenue in Albany, and its transmitter is located east of Doerun along the Colquitt–Worth county line.

History

The station signed on February 14, 1982 as WTSG-TV, Southwestern Georgia's first independent station. It was founded by black physician Carl Gordon Jr. The station's original studio facilities were located on North Slappey Boulevard/US 82 in Albany. It became a charter Fox affiliate on October 9, 1986. However, the station itself still operated as a de facto Independent station because the Fox network only had one program in its lineup until April 1987 and even then, would not expand to seven nights of programming per week until 1993. Prior to that time, the station itself aired movies on nights where Fox had no scheduled programming. Gordon sold the station to NewSouth Broadcasting in 1987. The station changed its call letters to the current WFXL in 1989.

Clarion Broadcasting purchased the station in 1996. Clarion then sold WFXL to the Wicks Broadcast Group (which also owned fellow Fox affiliates KCIT in Amarillo, Texas, KJTL in Wichita Falls, Texas–Lawton, Oklahoma, and WPGX in Panama City, Florida as well as NBC affiliate KMTR in Eugene, Oregon). in 1998. In March 1999, Waitt Broadcasting bought the station from Wicks. Raycom Media acquired the outlet in December 2003 through its purchase of most of Waitt Media's stations. In March 2006, Raycom announced the sale of WFXL and eleven other stations to Barrington Broadcasting in order to meet Federal Communications Commission (FCC) rules regarding station ownership. The company had just acquired the Liberty Corporation, owner of NBC affiliate WALB, which it decided to keep.

On June 1, 2006, a MH-47 Chinook military chopper traveling from Hunter Army Airfield in Savannah, Georgia to Fort Rucker in Alabama for a training mission hit a guy wire connected to WFXL's  tower resulting in a crash. While the tower and WALB's one nearby remained standing other than some guy wires, the stations were forced to temporarily cease over-the-air signals; broadcasts on cable were not affected. As a result, Raycom (which at that time still operated WFXL while the sale to Barrington awaited FCC approval) acquired auxiliary transmitters and antennas for both WFXL and WALB which were installed at a backup tower at WALB's studios in Albany.

On June 7, the WFXL tower was demolished, but in doing so one of the tower's guy wires wrapped around one for WALB's tower, as feared. As a result, that station's tower collapsed in an incident shown on live television. Since both stations were already transmitting their signals from the tower at the WALB studios they were still on the air but at low-power. Thirteen months later, a new tower for both WFXL and WALB was constructed and began broadcasting on July 3 at 11:35 p.m.

On February 28, 2013, Barrington Broadcasting announced the sale of its entire group, including WFXL, to the Sinclair Broadcast Group. The sale was completed on November 25. The station's second digital subchannel began carrying programming from Sinclair's American Sports Network syndication package starting with its inaugural broadcast on August 30, 2014. As a result of subsequent acquisitions by the Sinclair Broadcast Group, WFXL is sister to company-owned station clusters in Pensacola, Florida–Mobile, Alabama, Gainesville, Florida, and Tallahassee, Florida.

News operation
As a typical Fox affiliate with a weeknight prime time newscast, WFXL airs five hours of local news a week. Along with WALB, WFXL is one of two stations in Albany to produce local news that actually focus on the city (WSWG, the market's CBS affiliate, began to produce market-specific newscasts in 2019, but had for most of its existence carried the newscasts of former sister station WCTV in the Tallahassee, Florida market as a semi-satellite of that station).

In order to offer comprehensive severe weather coverage, WFXL purchased the most technologically advanced and powerful computerized weather system available in 2007. This included access to live Doppler weather radar capabilities from the National Weather Service site at Moody Air Force Base and an automated severe weather warning system.

In September 2008, WFXL gave its newscasts a new look by means of updating it graphic package and the construction of a new set. At the same time, it added a half hour to its weeknight prime time news at 10. It had aired, at one point, a weeknight newscast at 6:30 that competed with the national news shows on the big three stations. However, on September 19, 2011, WFXL replaced this newscast with a two-hour comedy block of syndicated programming. On October 24, 2011, it added a fourth hour to its weekday morning show which can now be seen from 5 until 9 a.m.

On January 22, 2016, WFXL dropped its four-hour morning show and replaced it with syndicated and E/I programming. This was followed in April 2016 with the cancellation of the station's half-hour weekend newscasts. Concurrently, production of the station's weeknight primetime newscasts were shifted to Macon sister station WGXA; all news and weather duties are now handled at WGXA, while local reporters are still assigned to Albany to provide coverage of the Southwestern Georgia area.

As of February 2023, WFXL has shuttered its news operation. No local news originates from WFXL or its Macon sister station WGXA. The Sinclair-produced show The National Desk airs each weekday from 6:00 a.m. to 9:00 a.m. and each evening from 10:00 p.m. to midnight.

Technical information

Subchannels
The station's digital signal is multiplexed:

Analog-to-digital conversion
WFXL shut down its analog signal, over UHF channel 31, on June 12, 2009, the official date in which full-power television stations in the United States transitioned from analog to digital broadcasts under federal mandate. The station's digital signal remained on its pre-transition VHF channel 12. Through the use of PSIP, digital television receivers display the station's virtual channel as its former UHF analog channel 31.

References

External links
 

Fox network affiliates
Comet (TV network) affiliates
Charge! (TV network) affiliates
TBD (TV network) affiliates
Television channels and stations established in 1982
1982 establishments in Georgia (U.S. state)
FXL
Sinclair Broadcast Group